Scott Jenkins is a retired American soccer defender who spent his entire professional career with the Seattle Sounders in the USL A-League.

Jenkins graduated from Redmond High School.  He attended the University of Washington, playing on the men's soccer team from 1992 to 1995.  In 1996, he played for the Everett BigFoot.  In 1997, he turned professional with the Seattle Sounders of the USL A-League.  Jenkins spent his entire career with Seattle, winning the league title in 2005, his last season with the team.

External links
 Scott Jenkins photo

References

Living people
1973 births
American soccer players
American soccer coaches
Everett BigFoot players
Seattle Sounders (1994–2008) players
USL First Division players
Washington Huskies men's soccer players
A-League (1995–2004) players
Soccer players from Washington (state)
Association football defenders
Sportspeople from Redmond, Washington